In secular usage, religious education is the teaching of a particular religion (although in the United Kingdom the term religious instruction would refer to the teaching of a particular religion, with religious education referring to teaching about religions in general) and its varied aspects: its beliefs, doctrines, rituals, customs, rites, and personal roles. In Western and secular culture, religious education implies a type of education which is largely separate from academia, and which (generally) regards religious belief as a fundamental tenet and operating modality, as well as a prerequisite for attendance.

The secular concept is substantially different from societies that adhere to religious law, wherein "religious education" connotes the dominant academic study, and in typically religious terms, teaches doctrines which define social customs as "laws" and the violations thereof as "crimes", or else misdemeanors requiring punitive correction.

The free choice of religious education by parents according to their conviction is protected by Convention against Discrimination in Education.

Religious education is controversial worldwide. Some countries, such as the United States, do not publicly fund religious education nor make it part of compulsory schooling. In other contexts, such as the United Kingdom, an 'open' religious education has emerged from Christian confessionalism that it is intended to promote religious literacy without imparting a particular religious perspective.

Overview

Since people within a given country often hold varying religious and non-religious beliefs, government-sponsored religious education can be a source of conflict. Countries vary widely in whether religious education is allowed in government-run schools (often called "public schools"). Those that allow it also vary in the type of education provided.

People oppose religious education in public schools on various grounds. One is that it constitutes a state sponsorship or establishment of whatever religious beliefs are taught. Others argue that if a particular religion is taught in school, children who do not belong to that religion will either feel pressure to conform or be excluded from their peers. Proponents argue that religious beliefs have historically socialized people's behavior and morality. They feel that teaching religion in school is important to encourage children to be responsible, spiritually sound adults.

Religious education by religion

Christianity 
In Christianity, catechesis refers to the religious instruction of children and adult converts.

The Church Educational System of the Church of Jesus Christ of Latter-day Saints (LDS Church) provides religious education for the youth and adults in 135 countries.

Islam 

In traditional Muslim education, children are taught to read and sometimes speak Arabic and memorize the major suras of the Qur'an. Many countries have state-run schools for this purpose (known as Madrasah Islamiyyah in Arabic; meaning "Islamic school"). Traditionally, a settlement may pay a mullah to teach children. There is a historic tradition of Sufi mullahs who wander and teach, and an ancient tradition of religious universities. However, the study of Islam alone does not suffice. Students must pass the state mandated curriculum to pass. Religious scholars often serve as judges, especially for criminal and family law (more rarely for commercial law). Religious scholars of Islam are well respected by their communities.

Judaism 
Jewish religious education mainly takes two forms: firstly, education regarding the main tenets of the faith and secondly, education regarding the laws and customs of the religion. The ultra-orthodox followers of Haredi Judaism teach only Jewish law and customs to their students, refraining from teaching any secular studies. The followers of Modern Orthodox Judaism, on the other hand, teach both secular studies and religious studies, with an emphasis on mixing Jewish values from the halakha with the secular, modern world. About Jewish religious education in a secular society, Michael Rosenak, an Israeli philosopher of Jewish education,  asserts that even when non-religious Jewish educators insist that the instruction of Judaism is not only a religious matter, they agree that  “the religious factor” was very important to its culture before secularism dawned on society, and that “an understanding of natural history and literature requires a sense of historical Jewish sensibility.

Approaches in various regions

New Zealand

In New Zealand, "Religious Education" refers to the academic teaching of religious studies. "Religious Instruction" refers to religious faith teaching, which occurs in private religious schools, integrated (religious) state schools or sometimes within Secular NZ State Primary Schools if directed by the individual schools' Board of Trustees. In 2017 around 40% of NZ State Primary Schools carried out religious instruction classes.

There are no officially recognised syllabuses as the school has to be officially closed in order to allow the classes to go ahead. There are organised groups such as the Secular Education Network and the NZ Association of Rationalists and Humanists, who are actively lobbying Government to have legislation changed to remove the classes from state primary schools.

China

In the People's Republic of China, formal religious education is permitted. Religious education usually occurs in scheduled sessions in private homes. Religious teachers usually move on a weekly or monthly circuit, staying as guests in private houses in exchange for teaching.

India

In India, there are a number of private schools run by religious institutions, especially for Hindus, Muslims, Sikhs, Christians, Jains and Buddhists. During the era of British rule, Christian private schools were quite prominent and widely attended by both UK (British) and Indian students. Many of the schools established during this era, especially in areas with a heavy Christian population, are still in existence today.

The school teaches academic education according to the standard UK curriculum, alongside devotional subjects of bhajan/kirtan singing and instrumentation and also Gaudiya Vaishnava philosophy. ISKCON has instituted a number of seminaries and schools of tertiary higher education. In addition to typical formal education, ISKCON also offers specialized religious/spiritual instructional programs in scriptural texts, standardized by the ISKCON Ministry for Educational Development and the GBC committee on Vaisnava Training & Education, categorized by level and difficulty; in India, they are primarily provided by the Mayapur Institute for Higher Education and Training and the Vrindavan Institute for Higher Education. ISKCON also offers instruction in archana, or murti worship and devotional ceremony, through the Mayapur Academy.

In addition to regular formal education, a number of religious institutions have instituted regular informal religious/spiritual education programs for children and adults.

Japan

In Japan, there are many Christian schools and universities with mandatory religious education. Any religious education at private middle and high schools requires the teacher to be accredited by a university teaching the religious education standards. Private schools with a traditional connection to Buddhist sects generally do not mandate any religious study. Religious or political education, or clubs that promote a specific religious or political group, are prohibited at public schools.

Pakistan

In Pakistan, Muslim students must take Islamic studies from primary to higher education. The subject is optional for non-Muslim students, who can choose the subject of ethics instead.

South East Asia

In Thailand, Burma and other majority Buddhist societies, Buddhist teachings and social decorum are sometimes taught in public school. Young men are expected to live as monks for several months at one time in their lives during which they can receive religious education.

Iran
About 90 percent of Iranians practice Shi'ism (Islam), the official religion of Iran. Sunni and Shi'i are the two largest branches of Islam, with the overwhelming majority of Iranians practicing Shi'i Islam.

The main religion which is being taught to students in Iran is Islam and its holy book called Quran. Students start to learn it at the elementary and secondary school (typically ages 7–14) and it is compulsory for them to learn it. The government tries to hire teachers who are kind and convincing in order to teach religious content step by step to students. Other religions are not taught in public schools. There are some private schools for the recognized minority groups who have other religions, that is Zoroastrianism, Christianity and Judaism. These schools are supervised by the Ministry of Education which imposes certain curriculum requirements. The directors of these private schools must be Muslim, with few exceptions.

Europe

Austria
Because of Austria's history as a multinational empire that included the largely Islamic Bosnia, Sunni Islam has been taught side by side with Roman Catholic, Protestant or Orthodox classes since the 19th century. However, children belonging to minority religions, such as Judaism, Buddhism and the Latter Day Saint movement also study religious education in their various denominations. At many schools, secular classes in Ethics can be attended alternatively.

Finland 
In Finland religious education is mandatory subject both in comprehensive schools (7–16 years) and in senior/upper secondary schools (16-18/19 years). Most of Finnish students study Evangelical Lutheran religious education. A student can receive religious education according to his or her own religion if the denomination is registered in Finland. Since religious education is a compulsory subject, pupils who do not belong to any religious group are taught Ethics. Also some non-Lutheran pupils participate in the Evangelical Lutheran religious education.

France
In France, the state recognizes no religion and does not fund religious education. However, the state subsidizes private teaching establishments, including religious ones, under strict conditions of not forcing religion courses on students and not discriminating against students according to religion. An exception is the area of Alsace-Moselle where, for historical reasons (it was ruled by Germany when this system was instituted in the rest of France) under a specific local law, the state supports public education in some religions (Catholic, Protestant, Jewish) mostly in accord with the German model.

Germany

Historically, the various confessions in Germany have contributed to primary and secondary education and do so still. Education in Germany still embodies the legacy of the Prussian education system introduced by Frederick the Great in 1763. The curricula of the various states of Germany since then have included not only basic technical skills but also music (singing) and religious (Christian) education in close cooperation with the churches. This has led to the churches being assigned a specific status as legal entity of public law, "Körperschaft des öffentlichen Rechts" in Germany, which is a legacy of a 1919 Weimar compromise still in force today.

Most of the federal states of Germany, which has a long history of almost even division between Roman Catholicism and Protestantism, have an arrangement whereby the religious bodies oversee the training of mainline Protestant, Catholic, and Jewish religious education teachers.

In one of the federal states this includes Orthodox Christian teachers as well. In Berlin, Bremen (see Bremen clause) and Brandenburg, religious education is not mandatory. E.g. in Bremen, state-authorized "Bible studies" were offered which were not supervised by a specific confession.

The training is supposed to be conducted according to modern standards of the humanities, and by teachers trained at mostly state-run colleges and universities. Those teachers teach religion in public schools, are paid by the state and are bound to the German constitution, as well as answerable to the churches for the content of their teaching. Children who are part of no mainstream religion (this applies e.g. to members of the New Apostolic Church) still have to take part in the classes of one of the confessions or, if they want to opt out, attend classes in Ethics or Philosophy instead. The Humanistischer Verband Deutschlands, an atheist and agnostic association, has adopted to the legal setup of the churches and is now allowed to offer such classes. From the age of 14, children may decide on their own if they want to attend religion classes and, if they do, which of those they are willing to attend. For younger children it is the decision of their parents. The state also subsidizes religious and Waldorf education schools by paying up to 90% of their expenses. These schools have to follow the same curricula as public schools of their federal state, though.

The introduction of Islamic religious education in Germany has faced various burdens and thresholds, but it is being introduced currently. While there are around three million Muslims, mostly of Turkish origin, now in the country (see Islam in Germany), not many of them are members of a legal entity with which the states could arrange such matters (unlike the Christian churches' representatives and the humanists). In 2013, for the first time in German history, the state of Hessen acknowledged a Muslim community, the reform-oriented Ahmadiyya, as Körperschaft des öffentlichen Rechts for all of Germany, which has been deemed a historical milestone. Ahmadiyya applied for the status just to be able to offer religious education in state schools, but is allowed now to maintain its own cemeteries and have its members' fees collected by the state's church tax system.

Greece
In Greece, students at public primary and secondary schools (typically ages 6–17) learn the basics of the Greek Orthodox faith using the official curriculum. In accordance to EU's religious freedom rules, their parents can opt them out of the religious classes by requesting it in paper without any additional justification. Students above the age of 18 can opt out by themselves. The students that opt-out attend alternative (non-religious) courses.

Universities (which are mostly public) don't have any religious content unless it's related to the studies.

Italy
In Italy, Catholic religious education is a curricula subject for students attending primary and secondary school (ages 6–19), though students can opt out of religious classes and attend alternative courses instead. Alternatively, if religious class takes place in the first or last hour, non-attending students can enter late to school or go out early. It consists of an optional hour a week for any primary and secondary school curriculum.

Data shows that the percentage of students who choose to attend religious class is in steady decline. In 2020, the percentage was 86%.

Religious education was first introduced as a mandatory activity in Italy during the fascist regime, following the 1929 Lateran Treaty, but in 1984 it became optional.

The law n. 186 of 2003 instituted the possibility of a national public recruiting for the religion professors to be enrolled within the Italian primary and secondary schools. The teachers become public servants waged directly by the Minister of Public Education and not removable from their working place. A specific norm enforced the right for enrolled religion professors to be destinated to different teaching matters, compatible with their academic degrees, if they were denied of the needy diocesan license or by effect of a personal request for a job transfer. To be admitted to the public recruiting selection the teachers need a specific teaching license released by their diocesan bishop. In 2004 it was held the first national and public recruiting selection of this type. Another has been forecasted until December 2021, after an agreement signed by Cardinal Gualtiero Bassetti and the Italian Minister of Public Education Lucia Azzolina.

On February 13, 2019, the Italian minister Marco Bussetti and the Cardinal Giuseppe Versaldi, Prefect of the Congregation for Catholic Education, signed an agreement for mutual recognition of academic qualifications issued in the universities of Holy See and Italy. The agreement increased significantly the number of degree titles recognized in the Italian public schools.

Religious education in Italian public schools is controversial. For some, studying Catholic religion is important to understand Italy's historic, cultural and artistic heritage, while for others it is considered in contrast with the constitutional principles of secularity and religious freedom  and also not appropriate for an increasingly diverse society. Some believe that religious education should be of exclusive competence of families and churches, therefore are opposed to religious education in public schools. However, the study of religion is always an optional choice in the public primary and secondary schools. The history of religions is taught within the scholastic curriculum of history, while some religious aspects are also integrated within the philosophy education of the Italian lyceums.

Latvia
In Latvia, since 2004 parents of the primary school students (grades 1 to 3) can choose Christian classes or the ethics.
Christian classes are interdenominational (based on common Lutheran, Roman Catholic, Orthodox, Baptist, Old Believer grounds).

Netherlands 

In the Netherlands, a distinction is made between public and special schools. Special schools teach on the basis of religion, philosophy of life or a vision of education. Public school lessons are not based on religion or belief. Public primary schools are most strongly represented in 2019 (31.6%), followed by Roman Catholic schools (30.5%), Protestant Christian primary schools (29.6%) and by primary schools with a denomination in the category 'other special' (8.3%). The relationship between schools with different denominations has remained stable in recent years. The government pays for both types of education. For this, schools must meet conditions. For example, education must be of sufficient quality. There are also requirements, for example, for the minimum number of pupils, the competence of teachers and the number of hours of education.

Poland
In Poland, religious education is optional in state schools. Parents decide whether children should attend religion classes or ethics classes or none of them. Since 2007, grades from religion (or ethics) classes are counted towards the grade point average.

Romania

Religious education is optional in Romanian state schools. Parents can freely choose which religion their children will study, but a majority of religious classes focus on the Romanian Orthodox faith, which is the majority religion in the country.

Turkey
Institutional education in general, and religious education in particular, is centralized in Turkey. This approach began with the Unity of Education Law, which was first drafted in 1924 and preserved in subsequent legal reforms and constitutional changes. Due to the secular revolution, previous practices of the Ottoman education system were abandoned. The newer Unity of Education Law was interpreted as totally excluding religious instruction from public schools. The newly established Republic of Turkey aimed to be secular and more western with the rule of Atatürk. In 1923, changes such as the acceptance of the Latin alphabet, which is taught to pupils in the national schools, and the Gregorian calendar took place in the new established country. With the closure of Madrasas, which were provided for the society to have religious knowledge and education, classes of religion were also abolished from the schools. Religious education such as Quran courses or other religious activities had to be controlled by the government and separated from regular education.

The situation changed in 1946 when the one-party period  came to an end. The faculty of Divinity was introduced in 1949 at Ankara University to educate, raise and train Imams, carry out scientific research about religion, mostly Islam. In 1956, as a result of multiparty democracy, a new government led by the former Democratic Party was established. This  government introduced a religion course into secondary schools. With the Democrat Party, religion started to show up as a lecture in the schools with the name of ‘The culture of religion and Knowledge of Ethics’ but  parents had to give their permission. Furthermore, Imam Hatip schools were established in some cities of Turkey with a limited number of students. In the following years, until the 1980 coup, the number of Imam Hatip Schools and religious education increased in Turkey. After the military coup in 1980, religious education in school was transformed and became a compulsory part of the curriculum, with the "Culture of Religion and Knowledge of Ethics" course. The content of religious education was  prepared by the state, which ensured that children were first exposed to accepted interpretations of Islam before being exposed to other religious teachings.

In the late 1990s, the right of students who are graduated from Imam Hatip schools was limited with the education reform bill. Moreover, the middle school Imam Hatip schools converted to  regular high schools for students to continue their higher education with other fields rather than Theology or Dignity faculties as their wish. Besides, in the beginning of 2000's a new law led to a decrease in the number of Quran courses because the law introduce for the students to attend Quran courses after they finished their eight year of education rather than five.

United Kingdom
In the United Kingdom, Catholic, Church of England (in England) and Jewish schools have long been supported within the state system, with all other state-funded schools having a duty to provide compulsory religious education. Until the introduction of the National Curriculum, religious education was the only compulsory subject in state schools. State school religious education is non-proselytising and covers a variety of faiths, although the legislation requires it to include more Christian content than other faiths. The Church of Scotland does not have schools, although it does often have a presence in Scottish non-denominational institutions. There is no National Curriculum for Religious Education in state schools in England. In England and Wales, the content of the syllabus for state schools is agreed on by local education authorities (LEAs), with the ratification of a Standing Advisory Council on Religious Education (SACRE) comprising members of different religious groups, teachers and local councillors. Parents with children in state schools can withdraw them from all or part of the lessons on religious, sex and relationship education if they want.

Small-scale research suggests religious education may be unpopular with students of minority religious backgrounds because it distorts and misrepresents religious traditions and their adherents.

In 2010, academics noted that RE had become overburdened with expectations in the UK, including acquiring and developing knowledge and understanding of Christianity and the other principal religions, developing the ability to make reasoned and informed judgements about religious and moral issues, enhancing pupils' spiritual, moral, cultural and social development, developing positive attitudes towards others.
 
Between 2017 and 2020, a University of Birmingham project examined the personal perspectives and professional beliefs of RE teachers in England. In a project article, three dominant moral assumptions of RE teachers were identified in historical literature. These moral assumptions were explained using the metaphor of a rhizome, in that they appear at regular intervals from the time of the 1870 Education Act to the present day. The first is the universalist assumption, which is that there are universal truths behind the all of the major world's religions, and that the study of religion can identify these and present them to pupils. The second is the vicarious assumption, which is the idea that teaching religion, one can build pupils’ world views, and also, therefore, their moral belief structures. The final is the instrumentalist assumption, which posits that through studying religion, pupils instrumentally become more moral over time.

There were four major findings in the final report of this project, based on 30 interviews and 314 survey respondents. Firstly, personal world views were found to inform RE teachers’ vision of what the subject should be, underpinning their motivation to teach the subject. There has historically been debate about whether RE teachers should strive to be neutral or impartial in the classroom; however, this finding suggests that such a position may not be desirable at all for the RE teacher. The report also details that RE teachers were consistently found to have fair and tolerant views of other religions and world views. There was strong agreement amongst the RE teachers sampled that RE contributes to character development, with 97.7% of RE teachers strongly agreeing or agreeing with this sentiment. RE teachers with a religious faith were more likely to think religions themselves promote good character. In a later published journal article, differences in the manner that teachers in faith and non-faith schools approach virtue knowledge and understanding were also identified.

North America

Canada
In Canada, religious education has varying status. On the one hand, publicly funded and organized separate schools for Roman Catholics and Protestants are mandated in some provinces and in some circumstances by various sections of the Constitution Act, 1867. On the other hand, with a growing level of multiculturalism, particularly in Ontario, debate has emerged as to whether publicly funded religious education for one group is permissible. For example, Newfoundland withdrew funding for Protestant and Roman Catholic schools in 1995, after a constitutional amendment. Quebec abolished religious education funded by the state through the Education Act, 1998, which took effect on July 1 of that same year, again after a constitutional amendment. Quebec re-organized the schools along linguistic rather than religious lines. In Ontario, however, the move to abolish funding has been strongly resisted. In the 2007 provincial election, the topic of funding for faith-based schools that were not Catholic became a major topic. The provincial conservative party was defeated due, in part, to their support of the idea.

United States
In the United States, religious education is often provided voluntary through supplementary "Sunday school", "Hebrew school", or catechism classes, taught to children at their families' places of worship, either in conjunction with worship services or some other time during the week, after weekday school classes. Some families believe supplementary religious education is inadequate, and send their children to private religious schools, called parochial schools when Catholic, day schools or yeshivas when Jewish. Many faiths also offer private college and graduate-level religious schools or seminaries, some of which are accredited as colleges.

Under U.S. law, religious education is forbidden in public schools, except from a neutral, academic perspective. However, in a minority of communities, released time is granted once a week to make religious education more convenient without violating the separation of church and state. For a teacher or school administration to endorse one religion is considered an infringement of the "establishment clause" of the First Amendment. The boundaries of this rule are frequently tested, with court cases challenging the treatment of Eastern religion meditation programs for students, traditional religious holidays, displays of religious articles and documents such as the Ten Commandments, the recitation of the Pledge of Allegiance (which since 1954 has described the U.S. as "one nation under God"), and whether prayer should be accommodated in the classroom.

See also

 Character education
 Christian views on the classics
 Freedom of education
 Islamic studies
 Jewish day school
 Parochial school
 Private school
 Religion and children
 Religious school
 Religious studies
 State religion
 Tripiṭaka

References

Further reading
 "Four Seventies Released", Ensign, November 1991.
 The Association for Asian Studies. "Session 93: Chinese Lay Buddhists in the Early Twentieth Century and the Question of Secularization: Four Case Studies." Association for Asian Studies, Inc., Mar. 2009. Web. 29 Sept. 2009
 "Faith in the System." Crown Copyright, 2007. Web. 29 Sept. 2009 
 Department of Education. "Overview of Governing Constitutional Principles." 15 Sept. 2003. Web. 29 Sept. 2009 
 A Cultural Study of Religious Education in America in Feng Chia Journal of Humanities and Social Sciences pp. 149–166, No.18, Jun. 2009, Author: Grace Hui Chin Lin

 Metcalfe, Jason; Moulin-Stożek, Daniel (2020). "Religious Education Teachers' Perspectives on Character Education". British Journal of Religious Education. 43 (3): 349–360.

External links